Four-sided dice, abbreviated d4, are often used in tabletop role-playing games to obtain random integers in the range 1–4. Three forms exist of this die: a tetrahedron (pyramid shape) with four equilateral triangle-shaped faces, a rectangular prism with rounded or pointed ends, and an elongated long die with four triangular faces. The latter type does not roll well and is thus usually thrown into the air or shaken in a box.

Historical
Four-sided dice were among the gambling and divination tools used by early man who carved them from nuts, wood, stone, ivory and bone. Six-sided dice were invented later but four-sided dice continued to be popular in Russia. In Ancient Rome, elongated four-sided dice were called tali while the six-sided cubic dice were tesserae. In India and Tibet, three four-sided long dice were rolled sequentially as an oracle, to produce 1 of 64 possible outcomes.

The ancient Mesopotamian Royal Game of Ur uses eight four-sided pyramid-shaped dice made out of rock, half of them colored white, and half black. The Scandinavian game daldøs uses a four-sided long die.

Modern gaming
Role-playing games involving four-sided tetrahedral dice include Dungeons & Dragons, Ironclaw, and Pathfinder Roleplaying Game. The d20 System includes a four-sided tetrahedral die among other dice with 6, 8, 10, 12 and 20 faces. Tetrahedral dice are peculiar in that there is no topmost face when a die comes to rest. There are several common ways of indicating the value rolled. On some tetrahedral dice, three numbers are shown on each face. The number rolled is indicated by the number shown upright at all three visible faces—either near the midpoints of the sides around the base or near the angles around the apex. Another configuration places only one number on each face, and the rolled number is taken from the downward face.

References

Dice